The Maltese Government 2003–2008 was the Government of Malta from 12 April 2003 to 10 March 2008. The Prime Ministers were Eddie Fenech Adami and Lawrence Gonzi

Cabinet

|}

See also
List of Maltese governments
Maltese Government 2008–2013
Maltese Government 2013–2018

Government of Malta
2003 establishments in Malta
2008 disestablishments in Malta
Cabinets established in 2003
Cabinets disestablished in 2008